Susan Konig is an American author and publisher who currently resides in Bronx, New York.

She has authored and published three humor books, two with St. Martin's Press and then all three with her own publishing company, Willow Street Press. Each book, including republished versions of the first two under the Willow Street Press imprint, is a collection of motherhood and family stories she wrote for publications such as The New York Post, Catholic Digest, and Parade Magazine. Willow Street Press has also published books by comedians Tom Cotter and Kerri Louise, journalist Joe Strupp, and memoirist Annette Ross.

She is the daughter of Marine author and novelist James Brady.

Books 
 Why Animals Sleep So Close to the Road (and Other Lies I Tell My Children)
 I Wear the Maternity Pants in This Family
 Teenagers and Toddlers Are Trying to Kill Me

References 

Year of birth missing (living people)
Living people
American columnists
American humorists
Writers from Ohio
Schools of the Sacred Heart alumni
Georgetown University alumni
New York University alumni
Writers from New York (state)
Place of birth missing (living people)
Women humorists
American women columnists
21st-century American non-fiction writers
21st-century American women writers
Journalists from New York City
American women non-fiction writers